Évora District is located in Alentejo, in southern Portugal. The district capital is the city of Évora.

Municipalities
The district is composed by 14 municipalities: 
 Alandroal
 Arraiolos
 Borba
 Estremoz
 Évora
 Montemor-o-Novo
 Mora
 Mourão
 Portel
 Redondo
 Reguengos de Monsaraz
 Vendas Novas
 Viana do Alentejo
 Vila Viçosa
All 14 municipalities is divided into 69 parishes or freguesias.

Summary of votes and seats won 1976-2022

|- class="unsortable"
!rowspan=2|Parties!!%!!S!!%!!S!!%!!S!!%!!S!!%!!S!!%!!S!!%!!S!!%!!S!!%!!S!!%!!S!!%!!S!!%!!S!!%!!S!!%!!S!!%!!S!!%!!S
|- class="unsortable" align="center"
!colspan=2 | 1976
!colspan=2 | 1979
!colspan=2 | 1980
!colspan=2 | 1983
!colspan=2 | 1985
!colspan=2 | 1987
!colspan=2 | 1991
!colspan=2 | 1995
!colspan=2 | 1999
!colspan=2 | 2002
!colspan=2 | 2005
!colspan=2 | 2009
!colspan=2 | 2011
!colspan=2 | 2015
!colspan=2 | 2019
!colspan=2 | 2022
|-
| align="left"| PS || 30.3 || 2 || 16.9 || 1 ||18.7 || 1 || 23.9 || 1 || 14.3 || 1 || 15.4 ||  || 25.9 || 1 || style="background:#FF66FF;"|42.6 || style="background:#FF66FF;"|2  || style="background:#FF66FF;"|45.7 || style="background:#FF66FF;"|2 || style="background:#FF66FF;"|42.8 || style="background:#FF66FF;"|1 || style="background:#FF66FF;"|49.7 || style="background:#FF66FF;"|2 || style="background:#FF66FF;"|35.0 || style="background:#FF66FF;"|1 || style="background:#FF66FF;"|29.0 || style="background:#FF66FF;"|1 || style="background:#FF66FF;"|37.5 || style="background:#FF66FF;"|1 || style="background:#FF66FF;"|38.3 || style="background:#FF66FF;"|2 || style="background:#FF66FF;"|44.0 || style="background:#FF66FF;"|2
|-
| align="left"| PSD || 9.2 ||  || align=center colspan=4|In AD || 18.6 || 1 || 19.1 || 1 || 32.1 || 2 || style="background:#FF9900;"|35.0 || style="background:#FF9900;"|2 || 20.2 || 1 || 18.7|| 1 || 25.3 || 1 || 16.7 ||  || 19.0 || 1 || 27.6 || 1 || align=center colspan=2|In PàF || 17.5 ||  || 21.4 || 1
|-
| align="left"| PCP/APU/CDU || style="background:red;"|42.2 || style="background:red;"|4 || style="background:red;"|48.9|| style="background:red;"|3 || style="background:red;"|45.7 || style="background:red;"|3 || style="background:red;"|47.6 || style="background:red;"|3 || style="background:red;"|41.2 || style="background:red;"|2 || style="background:red;"|36.2 || style="background:red;"|2 || 27.1 || 1 || 26.9 || 1 || 24.6 || 1 || 21.8 || 1 || 20.9 || 1 || 22.3 || 1 || 22.0 || 1 || 21.9 || 1 || 18.9 || 1 || 14.6 || 
|-
| align="left"| AD || colspan=2| || 26.9 || 1 || 29.2 || 1 || colspan=26|
|-
| align="left"| PRD || colspan=8| || 15.8 || 1 || 7.7 ||  || colspan=20|
|-
| align="left"| PàF || colspan=26| || 23.9 || 1 || colspan=4|
|-
! Total seats || colspan=2|6 || colspan=8|5 || colspan=8|4 || colspan=14|3 
|-
! colspan=33|Source: Comissão Nacional de Eleições
|}

 
Districts of Portugal
District